The Renfe Class 352 (formerly the T-2000) was a class of twin engined four axle diesel-hydraulic locomotives built by Krauss-Maffei, designed solely for passenger traffic; in particular they were responsible for towing Andalusian Talgo III trains. The class were very successful, heralding a new era of passenger trains in Spain. They were delivered in 1964 and 1965, and were fully withdrawn during the 1990s.

Background and design 

With the Talgo II coaches having proved successful, and a new class of coaches—the Talgo III being introduced in the early 1960s—a new type of express locomotive was required to pull them. On 28 May 1962, the Board of Directors of Renfe placed an order for the locomotives needed, and the 2000-T series is born.

Unlike the fixed formation Talgo II trains, the Talgo III was to have a locomotive which was separable from the coaches. Five locomotives were initially built by Krauss-Maffei, who gave the locomotives the internal designation ML 2400; in Spain they are placed in the class 2000-T. The Krauss-Maffei design is chosen since no other manufacturer offers similar power in the reduced height, and low centre of gravity that matches the Talgo trainsets, the internal design is very similar to the DB Class V 200.0 with the same engine and hydraulic drive, and similar bogies, though the exterior, and gauge are totally different. A further five locomotives were then built by Babcock & Wilcox under license.

Being designed solely in order to pull Talgo III trains they have only one cab, an automatic Scharfenberg coupler, buffers specially adapted, and the necessary auxiliary power supply equipment.

Upon delivery of the 2000 T the trains are tested using wagons from Transfesa, which were available at the time. AT delivery and decommissioning they carried a red and silver livery, like all locomotives for the Talgo service, they are given names.

Initially the locomotives had a 'wrap around' windscreen, in the 1980s they were refurbished with the windscreen replaced as part of a cab upgrade and air condition was fitted on the roof at the same time.

Operations

Upon delivery, all were assigned to Aravaca.

The first arrivals were assigned to Talgo services from Barcelona to Madrid from 20 August 1964.

Electrification, and the introduction in the 1970s of the Japanese Renfe Class 269 displaced the locomotives onto non electrified lines. From then on Class 352 are used on non-electrified lines such as Badajoz - Lisbon, Granada - Almeria, Murcia - Cartagena.

In 1980 352-004 is altered in order to tow the new Talgo pendular trains; working between Zaragoza and Madrid from June 1980. Later on it is used on Talgo pendular trains between Madrid and Cartagena.

Between September 1995 to April 1996, 352-004 is used on the Talgo pendular Madrid - Cartagena replacing the damaged 354-008.

The locomotives started to be decommissioned at the turn of the century - with machines requiring major work being removed rather than repaired. In time the last of the class to cease work was 312-001 (which was also the first delivered) was withdrawn in 2002 having given 38 years of service with over 7 million kilometers travelled.

Names and fleet details

After withdrawal
352-009 is preserved under the National Museum of the railways.

The front cabin of 352-005 is on display at the railway museum Museu del Ferrocarril of Vilanova, whilst the front of 352-001 was given to the railway museum of Arganda. The control panel of one Class 352 is also kept in the museum of Délicias.

See also
Renfe Class 353, Renfe Class 354 - subsequent faster and more powerful locomotives built to a very similar design by Krauss-Maffei.

References

Literature
 Casas Juan Carlos : Locomotoras diesel 352 y 353. in Via Libre n° 483, 02/2005
 Salmeron i Bosch, Carles : Las locomotoras de España. Editorial Terminus, Barcelona, 1985

External links

 Images of the Renfe Class 352 

352
B-B locomotives
Talgo
Diesel locomotives of Spain
Railway locomotives introduced in 1964
5 ft 6 in gauge locomotives
Passenger locomotives